Irma Taylor (14 December 1890 – 17 April 1974) was an American screenwriter and actress of the silent era notable for playing Jane Eyre in Jane Eyre (1910), the English language film of the novel of the same name.

Born in Michigan in the United States in 1890 as Irma Whepley, the daughter of Dora Alice Smith née Beardsley (1868–1953) and William Long Whepley (1850–1915), she married the screenwriter Rex Allison Taylor (1889-1968) in about 1910. The marriage was later dissolved, following which she married George Fife, which lasted until her death. She was an actress with the Thanhouser Company for whom she appeared in various films released from 1910 through 1912. In the latter year she went to St. Augustine with the Thanhouser players.

With the Thanhouser Company she played the title role in Jane Eyre (1910) and appeared in The Lady from the Sea (1911), and as Ustane in She (1911). She provided the story to the screenplay by her husband for  the films The Menace (1918), The Other Man (1918),<ref>[https://books.google.com/books?id=-gsDAAAAYAAJ&pg=PA74 Catalogue of Copyright Entries: Pamphlets, leaflets for the Year 1918, Volume 15, Issue 1], Government Printing Office (1919) - Google Books pg. 1665</ref> Leave It to Susan (1919) and They Like 'Em Rough'' (1922). In 1944, to a melody by her relative Harry James Beardsley she wrote the lyrics to the published song "All of my heart went with you".

She died in Glendale in California in 1974 and is buried in Forest Lawn Memorial Park in Glendale.

References

External links
Irma Taylor on the Internet Movie Database

1890 births
1974 deaths
People from Michigan
20th-century American actresses
American silent film actresses
American film actresses
American women screenwriters
20th-century American women writers
20th-century American screenwriters